The Mendrisio electric tramway (TEM) was a metre gauge electric tramway in the Swiss canton of Ticino. It linked the town of Chiasso with Riva San Vitale, via Balerna, Mendrisio and Capolago. It was operated by the Società Tram Elettrici Mendrisiensi SA.

The line's southern terminus in Chiasso was adjacent to the border crossing with Italy, and in Capolago it shared the same street outside Capolago-Riva San Vitale railway station with the Monte Generoso railway. The track ran entirely within the street, and was electrified at 800 V DC.

The Società Tram Elettrici Mendrisiensi SA was incorporated in 1907, and construction started the following year, with the tramway opening in 1910. The line closed throughout in 1950, having closed between Riva San Vitale and Mendrisio in 1948. In 1953, the company changed its name to the Autolinea Mendrisiense SA, and now operates Mendrisio's local bus service, including services covering much of the former route of the tramway.

Very little remains of the tramway, although the line's main depot in Mendrisio was used by Autolinea Mendrisiense until 2010, and a smaller depot in Capolago is still used by them as a bus  garage. After closure, several of the line's cars were sold to the Lugano–Cadro–Dino railway, and one of these (Ce 2/2 3) has since been restored and is now on display at the Hotel Coronado in Mendrisio.

References

External links 
 

Closed railway lines in Switzerland
Mendrisio
Metre gauge railways in Switzerland
Tram transport in Switzerland
Transport in Ticino